Josiah Wedgwood  (12 July 1730 – 3 January 1795) was an English potter, entrepreneur and abolitionist. Founding the Wedgwood company in 1759, he developed improved pottery bodies by systematic experimentation, and was the leader in the industrialisation of the manufacture of European pottery.

The renewed classical enthusiasms of the late 1760s and early 1770s were of major importance to his sales promotion. His expensive goods were in much demand from the upper classes, while he used emulation effects to market cheaper sets to the rest of society. Every new invention that Wedgwood produced – green glaze, creamware, black basalt, and jasperware – was quickly copied. Having once achieved efficiency in production, he obtained efficiencies in sales and distribution. His showrooms in London gave the public the chance to see his complete range of tableware.

Wedgwood's company never made porcelain during his lifetime, but specialised in fine earthenwares and stonewares that had many of the same qualities, but were considerably cheaper.  He made great efforts to keep the designs of his wares in tune with current fashion.   He was an early adopter of transfer printing which gave similar effects to hand-painting for a far lower cost. Meeting the demands of the consumer revolution that helped drive the Industrial Revolution in Britain, Wedgwood is credited as a pioneer of modern marketing. He pioneered direct mail, money back guarantees, self-service, free delivery, buy one get one free, and illustrated catalogues.

A prominent abolitionist fighting slavery, Wedgwood is remembered too for his Am I Not a Man And a Brother? anti-slavery medallion. He was a member of the Darwin–Wedgwood family, and he was the grandfather of Charles and Emma Darwin.

Early life 

Born in Burslem, Staffordshire, the eleventh and last child of potter Thomas Wedgwood (d. 1739) and Mary Wedgwood (née Stringer; d. 1766), Josiah was raised within a family of English Dissenters; he was the grandson of a Unitarian minister and was an active Unitarian. By the age of nine, he was proving himself to be a skilled potter. He survived a childhood bout of smallpox to serve as an apprentice potter under his eldest brother Thomas Wedgwood IV. Smallpox left Josiah with a permanently weakened knee, which made him unable to work the foot pedal of a potter's wheel. As a result, he concentrated from an early age on designing pottery and then making it with the input of other potters. The pottery created in his father's and brother's business was inexpensive and low quality, black and mottled in color.

In his early twenties, Wedgwood began working with the most renowned English pottery-maker of his day, Thomas Whieldon, who eventually became his business partner in 1754.  Wedgwood also began to study the new science of chemistry, seeking to understand the materials science of fire, clay, and minerals and to develop better clays and glazes for potter-making. Following an accident in 1762, Wedgwood met Joseph Priestley, another Dissenter and a chemist who gave Wedgwood advice on chemistry.
Wedgwood's experimentation with a wide variety of techniques coincided with the burgeoning of the nearby industrial city of Manchester. Inspired, Wedgwood leased the Ivy Works in the town of Burslem. From 1768 to 1780 he partnered with Thomas Bentley, a businessman from a landowning family who was socially sophisticated and had an astute taste. Over the course of the next decade, his experimentation (and a considerable injection of capital from his marriage to a richly endowed distant cousin) transformed the sleepy artisan works into the first true pottery factory.

Marriage and children 

In January 1764 Wedgwood married Sarah Wedgwood (1734–1815), his third cousin. They had eight children:

 Susannah Wedgwood (3 January 1765 – 1817) married Robert Darwin and became the mother of the English naturalist Charles Darwin. Charles married Emma Wedgwood, his cousin.
 John Wedgwood (1766–1844), joined the business rather reluctantly, mainly interested in horticulture
 Richard Wedgwood (1767–1768) (died as a child)
 Josiah Wedgwood II (1769–1843) (father of Emma Darwin, cousin and wife of Charles Darwin)
 Thomas Wedgwood (1771–1805) (no children), best known as a pioneer photographer
 Catherine Wedgwood (1774–1823) (no children)
 Sarah Wedgwood (1776–1856) (no children, very active in the abolition movement and founding member of Birmingham Ladies Society for the Relief of Negro Slaves, the first anti-slavery society for women)
 Mary Anne Wedgwood (1778–86) (died as a child)

Career and Work

Pottery 

Wedgwood was keenly interested in the scientific advances of his day and it was this interest that underpinned his adoption of its approach and methods to revolutionise the quality of his pottery. His unique glazes began to distinguish his wares from anything else on the market.

By 1763, he was receiving orders from the highest-ranking people, including Queen Charlotte. Wedgwood convinced her to let him name the line of pottery she had purchased "Queen's Ware", and trumpeted the royal association in his paperwork and stationery. Anything Wedgwood made for the Queen was automatically exhibited before it was delivered. In 1764, he received his first order from abroad. Wedgwood marketed his Queen's Ware at affordable prices, everywhere in the world British trading ships sailed. In 1767 he wrote, "The demand for this sd. Creamcolour, Alias, Queen Ware, Alias, Ivory, still increases – It is amazing how rapidly the use of it has spread  over the whole Globe." 

He first opened a warehouse at Charles Street, Mayfair in London as early as 1765 and it soon became an integral part of his sales organization. In two years, his trade had outgrown his rooms in Grosvenor Square. In 1767, Wedgwood and Bentley drew up an agreement to divide decorative wares between them, the domestic wares being sold on Wedgwood's behalf. A special display room was built to beguile the fashionable company. Wedgwood's in fact had become one of the most fashionable meeting places in London. His workers had to work day and night to satisfy the demand, and the crowds of visitors showed no sign of abating. The proliferating decoration, the exuberant colours, and the universal gilding of rococo were banished, the splendours of baroque became distasteful; the intricacies of chinoiserie lost their favour. The demand was for purity, simplicity and antiquity. To encourage this outward spread of fashion and to speed it on its way Wedgwood set up warehouses and showrooms at Bath, Liverpool and Dublin in addition to his showrooms at Etruria and in Westminster. Great care was taken in timing the openings, and new goods were held back to increase their effect.

The most important of Wedgwood's early achievements in vase production was the perfection of the black stoneware body, which he called "basalt". This body could imitate the colour and shapes of Etruscan or Greek vases which were being excavated in Italy. In 1769, "vases was all the cry" in London; he opened a new factory called Etruria, north of Stoke. Wedgwood became what he wished to be: "Vase Maker General to the Universe". Around 1771, he started to experiment with Jasperware, but he did not advertise this new product for a couple of years.

Sir George Strickland, 6th Baronet, was asked for advice on getting models from Rome. Gilding was to prove unpopular, and around 1772, Wedgwood reduced the amount of "offensive gilding" in response to suggestions from Sir William Hamilton. When English society found the uncompromisingly naked figure of the classics "too warm" for their taste, and the ardor of the Greek gods too readily apparent, Wedgwood was quick to cloak their pagan immodesty – gowns for the girls and fig leaves for the gods were usually sufficient. Just as he felt that his flowerpots would sell more if they were called "Duchess of Devonshire flowerpots", his creamware more if called Queensware, so he longed for Brown, James Wyatt, and the brothers Adam to lead the architect in the use of his chimneypieces and for George Stubbs to lead the way in the use of Wedgwood plaques.

Wedgwood hoped to monopolise the aristocratic market and thus win for his wares a special social cachet that would filter to all classes of society. Wedgwood fully realised the value of such a lead and made the most of it by giving his pottery the name of its patron: Queensware, Royal Pattern, Russian pattern, Bedford, Oxford and Chetwynd vases for instance. Whether they owned the original or merely possessed a Wedgwood copy mattered little to Wedgwood's customers. In 1773 they published the first Ornamental Catalogue, an illustrated catalogue of shapes. A plaque, in Wedgwood's blue pottery style, marking the site of his London showrooms between 1774 and 1795 in Wedgwood Mews, is located at 12, Greek Street, London, W1.
 

In 1773, Empress Catherine the Great ordered the (Green) Frog Service from Wedgwood, consisting of 952 pieces and over a thousand original paintings, for the Kekerekeksinen Palace (palace on a frog swamp ), later known as Chesme Palace. Most of the painting was carried out in Wedgwood's decorating studio at Chelsea. Its display, Wedgwood thought, 'would bring an  number of People of Fashion into our Rooms. For over a month the fashionable world thronged the rooms and blocked the streets with their carriages. (Catharine paid £2,700. It can still be seen in the Hermitage Museum.) Strictly uneconomical in themselves, these productions offered huge advertising value.

Later years 
As a leading industrialist, Wedgwood was a major backer of the Trent and Mersey Canal dug between the River Trent and River Mersey, during which time he became friends with Erasmus Darwin. Later that decade, his burgeoning business caused him to move from the smaller Ivy Works to the newly built Etruria Works, which would run for 180 years. The factory was named after the Etruria district of Italy, where black porcelain dating to Etruscan times was being excavated. Wedgwood found this porcelain inspiring, and his first major commercial success was its duplication with what he called "Black Basalt". He combined experiments in his art and in the technique of mass production with an interest in improved roads, canals, schools, and living conditions. At Etruria, he even built a village for his workers. The motto, Sic fortis Etruria crevit, was inscribed over the main entrance to the works.

Not long after the new works opened, continuing trouble with his smallpox-afflicted knee made necessary the amputation of his right leg. In 1780, his long-time business partner Thomas Bentley died, and Wedgwood turned to Darwin for help in running the business. As a result of the close association that grew up between the Wedgwood and Darwin families, Josiah's eldest daughter would later marry Erasmus' son.

To clinch his position as leader of the new fashion, he sought out the famous Barberini vase as the final test of his technical skill. Wedgwood's obsession was to duplicate the Portland Vase, a blue-and-white glass vase dating to the first century BC. He worked on the project for three years, eventually producing what he considered a satisfactory copy in 1789.

In 1784, Wedgwood was exporting nearly 80% of his total produce. By 1790, he had sold his wares in every city in Europe. To give his customers a greater feeling of the rarity of his goods, he strictly limited the number of jaspers on display in his rooms at any given time.

  
He was elected to the Royal Society in 1783 for the development of the pyrometric device (a type of pyrometer) to measure the high temperatures which are reached in kilns during the firing of ceramics.

He was an active member of the Lunar Society of Birmingham, often held at Erasmus Darwin House, and is remembered on the Moonstones in Birmingham.

Death 
After passing on his company to his sons, Wedgwood died at home, probably of cancer of the jaw, in 1795. He was buried three days later in the parish church of Stoke-upon-Trent. Seven years later a marble memorial tablet commissioned by his sons was installed there.

Legacy and influence

One of the wealthiest entrepreneurs of the 18th century, Wedgwood created goods to meet the demands of the consumer revolution and growth in prosperity that helped drive the Industrial Revolution in Britain. He is credited as a pioneer of modern marketing, specifically direct mail, money back guarantees, travelling salesmen, carrying pattern boxes for display, self-service, free delivery, buy one get one free, and illustrated catalogues. Wedgwood is also noted as an early adopter/founder of managerial accounting principles in Anthony Hopwood's "Archaeology of Accounting Systems." Historian Tristram Hunt called Wedgwood a "difficult, brilliant, creative entrepreneur whose personal drive and extraordinary gifts changed the way we work and live."

He was a friend, and commercial rival, of the potter John Turner the elder; their works have sometimes been misattributed. For the further comfort of his foreign buyers he employed French-, German-, Italian- and Dutch-speaking clerks and answered their letters in their native tongue.

Wedgwood belonged to the fifth generation of a family of potters whose traditional occupation continued through another five generations. Wedgwood's company is still a famous name in pottery (as part of the Fiskars group), and "Wedgwood China" is sometimes used as a term for his Jasperware, the coloured pottery with applied relief decoration (usually white).

Abolitionism

Wedgwood was a prominent slavery abolitionist. His friendship with Thomas Clarkson – abolitionist campaigner and the first historian of the British abolition movement – aroused his interest in slavery. Wedgwood mass-produced cameos depicting the seal for the Society for Effecting the Abolition of the Slave Trade and had them widely distributed, which thereby became a popular and celebrated image. The Wedgwood anti-slavery medallion was the most famous image of a black person in all of 18th-century art. The actual design of the cameo was probably done by either William Hackwood or Henry Webber who were modellers at his factory.

From 1787 until his death in 1795, Wedgwood actively participated in the abolition-of-slavery cause. His Slave Medallion brought public attention to abolition. Wedgwood reproduced the design in a cameo with the black figure against a white background and donated hundreds to the society for distribution. Thomas Clarkson wrote: "ladies wore them in bracelets, and others had them fitted up in an ornamental manner as pins for their hair. At length the taste for wearing them became general, and thus fashion, which usually confines itself to worthless things, was seen for once in the honourable office of promoting the cause of justice, humanity and freedom".

The design on the medallion became popular and was used elsewhere: large-scale copies were painted to hang on walls and it was used on clay tobacco pipes.

Other
Erasmus Darwin House, Erasmus Darwin Museum house and gardens
 A locomotive named "Josiah Wedgwood" ran on the Cheddleton Railway Centre in 1977. It returned in May 2016 following ten years away.
 Commemorating the landing of the First Fleet at Sydney Cove in January 1788, Wedgwood made the Sydney Cove Medallion, using a sample of clay from the cove from Sir Joseph Banks, who had himself received it from Governor Arthur Phillip. Wedgwood made the commemorative medallion showing an allegorical group described as, "Hope encouraging Art and Labour, under the influence of Peace, to pursue the employments necessary to give security and happiness to an infant settlement".

Notes

References 
 Dolan, Brian (2004). Wedgwood: The First Tycoon. Viking Adult. 
 McKendrick, Neil. "Josiah Wedgwood and the Commercialization of the Potteries", in: McKendrick, Neil; Brewer, John & Plumb, J.H. (1982), The Birth of a Consumer Society: The commercialization of Eighteenth-century England

Further reading
 Hunt, Tristram. The Radical Potter: Josiah Wedgwood and the Transformation of Britain (2021)
 Burton, Anthony. Josiah Wedgwood: A New Biography (2020)
 Koehn, Nancy F. Brand New : How Entrepreneurs Earned Consumers' Trust from Wedgwood to Dell (2001) pp. 11–42.
 Langton, John. "The ecological theory of bureaucracy: The case of Josiah Wedgwood and the British pottery industry." Administrative Science Quarterly (1984): 330–354.
 McKendrick, Neil. "Josiah Wedgwood and Factory Discipline." Historical Journal 4.1 (1961): 30–55. online
 McKendrick, Neil. "Josiah Wedgwood and cost accounting in the Industrial Revolution." Economic History Review 23.1 (1970): 45–67. online
 McKendrick, Neil. "Josiah Wedgwood: an eighteenth-century entrepreneur in salesmanship and marketing techniques." Economic History Review 12.3 (1960): 408–433. online
 Meteyard, Eliza. Life and Works of Wedgwood (2 vol 1865)  vol 1 online; also vol 2 online
 Reilly, Robin, Josiah Wedgwood 1730–1795 (1992), scholarly biography
 Wedgwood, Julia, and Charles Harold Herford. The Personal Life of Josiah Wedgwood, the Potter (1915) online

External links 

Wedgwood website 
Vaizey, Marina, "Science into Art, Art into Science", The Tretyakov Gallery Magazine, No 2, 2016 (51) (good online summary)
Wedgwood collection at the Lady Lever Art Gallery
Wedgwood Museum
The Great Crash by Jenny Uglow, The Guardian, 7 February 2009
National Museum of Australia The Sydney Cove Medallion (Flash required for close-up viewing).
The Story of Wedgwood 
Josiah Wedgwood Correspondence (transcripts), John Rylands Library, Manchester.

1730 births
1795 deaths
18th-century English people
Burials in Staffordshire
Ceramics manufacturers of England
Darwin–Wedgwood family
English abolitionists
English amputees
English chief executives
English company founders
English potters
English Unitarians
Fellows of the Royal Society
Creators of temperature scales
Members of the Lunar Society of Birmingham
Neoclassical artists
People from Burslem
People of the Industrial Revolution
Staffordshire pottery
Wedgwood pottery
English inventors